Pierrelatte is a commune in the Drôme department in southeastern France. Since the 1980s it hosts one of the biggest production plants of the enriched uranium existing in the world, used both for civil and military purposes.

Population

Personalities 
 Jean Aurenche, screenwriter (1903-1992)
 Cédric Séguin, fencer (born 1973)
 David Guerrier, classical trumpeter (born 1984)

See also
Communes of the Drôme department
Tricastin Nuclear Power Plant

References

Communes of Drôme
Dauphiné